Rock Castle or Rockcastle may refer to:

Rock castle, a type of medieval castle

in the United States (by state)
Rockcastle, Kentucky, unincorporated community
Rockcastle River, a river in Kentucky
Rock Castle (Hendersonville, Tennessee), listed on the National Register of Historic Places in Sumner County, Tennessee
Rock Castle, Virginia, a community
Rock Castle (Virginia), listed on the National Register of Historic Places in Goochland County, Virginia
Rock Castle, West Virginia, a community